Cherwell is a local government district in northern Oxfordshire, England.  The district takes its name from the River Cherwell, which drains south through the region to flow into the River Thames at Oxford.

Towns in Cherwell include Banbury and Bicester. Kidlington is a contender for largest village in England.

The district was formed on 1 April 1974, under the Local Government Act 1972, by a merger of the municipal borough of Banbury, Bicester urban district, Banbury Rural District and Ploughley Rural District.

Geography
The Northern half of the Cherwell district consists mainly of soft rolling hills going down towards the River Cherwell, but the southern half of the district around Bicester is much flatter.
Much of the district is soft rolling hills with the northwest of the district lying at the northern extremity of the Cotswolds.

Transport
Much of the district is within easy reach of the M40, with junctions 9, 10 and 11 in the district. It also has good rail links with London, Birmingham, Oxford and the South.

Politics

Elections to the council are held in three out of every four years, with one third of the 48 seats on the council being elected at each election. Since the 2000 election the Conservative party has had a majority on the council. This followed 2 years of no overall control, in turn preceded by 2 years of control by Labour.

Following the 2022 election, the make-up of the council is as follows:

Settlements in Cherwell district 

Adderbury, Ambrosden, Ardley, Arncott
Banbury, Barford St. John, Barford St. Michael, Begbroke, Bicester
Blackthorn
Bletchingdon, Bloxham, Bodicote
Broughton
Bucknell, Burdrop
Charlton-on-Otmoor, Claydon, Cottisford, Cropredy
Deddington, Drayton, Duns Tew
Epwell
Fencott, Finmere, Fringford, Fritwell
Godington, Gosford, Great Bourton
Hampton Poyle, Hanwell, Hardwick, Hethe
Hook Norton, Horley
Islip
Juniper Hill 
Kidlington, Kirtlington
Launton, Little Bourton, Lower Heyford
Merton, Middle Aston, Middleton Stoney
Milcombe, Milton, Mixbury, Mollington, Murcott
Noke, North Aston, North Newington
Oddington
Prescote
Shenington, Shipton-on-Cherwell, Shutford
Sibford Ferris, Sibford Gower, Somerton
Souldern, South Newington, Steeple Aston, Stoke Lyne, Swalcliffe
Tadmarton, Thrupp
Upper Heyford
Wardington, Water Eaton, Weston-on-the-Green, Wroxton
Yarnton

Recycling in Cherwell 
Cherwell district has one of the country's highest recycling rates at over 40% (2005). The district used to have a recycling rate of just 9%. This changed with the introduction of the blue box scheme for recycling paper, which has since grown to include plastic, cardboard and cans.  Kidlington has its own freecycling group.

Food safety enforcement 
Cherwell District came top of a Which? study that ranked 395 local authorities in Britain on their record of enforcement of food safety regulations.

Leisure Provision 
Cherwell District provides a range of leisure and sporting facilities to local residents, catering to a range of sports through their leisure centres and open spaces.

Arms

See also
 Cherwell local elections
 History of Banbury, Oxfordshire

References 

 
Non-metropolitan districts of Oxfordshire